In Hawaiian mythology, Laʻa Maomao is the god of the wind. He was said to be created in the midst of chaos by his father, the sun god. Largely a benevolent entity, he is the god of forgiveness.

See also 
Raka Maomao
Fa'atiu

Notes 

Hawaiian gods
Wind deities